Yegor (Egor) Ivanovich Zolotarev (31 March 1847, Saint Petersburg – 19 July 1878, Saint Petersburg) was a Russian mathematician.

Biography 

Yegor  was born  as a son of Agafya Izotovna Zolotareva and the merchant Ivan Vasilevich Zolotarev in Saint Petersburg, Imperial Russia. 
In 1857 he began to study at the fifth St Petersburg gymnasium, a school which centred on mathematics and natural science. He finished it with the silver medal in 1863. In the same year he was allowed to be an auditor at the physico-mathematical faculty of St Petersburg university.

He had not been able to become a student before 1864 because he was too young. Among his academic teachers were Somov, Chebyshev and Aleksandr Korkin, with whom he would have a tight scientific friendship.
In November 1867 he defended his Kandidat thesis “About the Integration of Gyroscope Equations”, after 10 months there followed his thesis pro venia legendi About one question on Minima. With this work he was given the right to teach as a private lecturer at St Petersburg university.

He first lectured on differential calculus to science students (until summer 1871), later integral calculus and analysis to beginners of mathematics. Except for a short pause he lectured on elliptic functions to students of higher semesters during his whole job as lecturer and professor.

In December 1869, Zolotarev defended his master's thesis “About the Solution of the Indefinite Equation of Third Degree x³ + Ay³ + A²z³ - 3Axyz = 1”.

He took his first trip abroad in 1872 and visited Berlin and Heidelberg. In
Berlin he attended Weierstrass' "theory of analytic functions", in Heidelberg Koenigsberger's.

In 1874, Zolotarev become a member of the university staff as a lecturer and in
the same year he defended his doctoral thesis “Theory of integer Complex Numbers with an Application to Integral Calculus”. The algorithm Zolotarev proved there
was created by Chebyshev and that algorithm allowed to see whether integral of the form

was elementary, in this case representable in logarithms. This was a question Chebyshev had been interested in since the beginning of his research.

Starting at the beginning of the winter semester 1876 Zolotarev was appointed extraordinary professor, and after the death of academician Somov he became his successor as an adjunct of the Academy of Sciences.

Egor Ivanovich Zolotarev's steep career ended abruptly with his early death. He was on his way to his dacha when he was run over by a train in the Tsarskoe Selo station. On 19 July 1878 he died from blood poisoning.

Yegor Ivanovich is not to be confused with the probabilist Vladimir Mikhaelovich Zolotarev, Kolmogorov's disciple, who worked on stable distributions with well known results on their parametrization.

Bibliography

See also
 Zolotarev's lemma
 Zolotarev polynomials
 Elliptic filter also known as a Zolotarev filter.

References

External links

1847 births
1878 deaths
19th-century mathematicians from the Russian Empire
Mathematicians from Saint Petersburg
Saint Petersburg State University alumni
Full members of the Saint Petersburg Academy of Sciences
Railway accident deaths in Russia
Number theorists
Approximation theorists